Myrlaea dentilineella is a species of snout moth in the genus Myrlaea. It was described by Émile Louis Ragonot in 1887 and is known from Turkey (including Malatia, the type location).

References

Moths described in 1887
Phycitini
Endemic fauna of Turkey
Taxa named by Émile Louis Ragonot